Scott Arnold (born 8 February 1986 in Sydney) is a professional squash player who represented Australia. He reached a career-high singles world ranking of World No. 54 in January 2008, and is currently the number 1 ranked doubles player in the world.

References

External links 
 
 

Australian male squash players
Living people
1986 births
Sportsmen from New South Wales
Sportspeople from Sydney
Competitors at the 2009 World Games
20th-century Australian people
21st-century Australian people